Cúl Green was an initiative aimed at making Ireland's largest sports stadium, Croke Park, carbon-neutral. Cúl Green, which means 'Green Goal' in Irish, was launched in May 2008 and involved the Gaelic Athletic Association (GAA) and Electricity Supply Board (ESB) developing an environmental-improvement programme covering the stadium's electricity, waste and water management systems. In a 2010 press release, the GAA stated that the initiative had been "successful" and had "made Croke Park a carbon-neutral stadium".

Environmental impact and targets
Approximately 2.2 million people attended Croke Park in 2007, making it the biggest venue in Ireland and the sustainability plan extended to fans' activities in reducing the environmental impact of their travel to and from the stadium.

The Cúl Green plan set environmental targets for Croke Park, intended to reduce the carbon footprint the sporting venue over a period of six years. The project proposed to cut Croke Park's annual 4,500 tonnes carbon emissions output by more than two-thirds.

The Cúl Green project was supported and audited by the Carbon Reduction (CRed) Programme which was set up in 2003 by the University of East Anglia.

Website
The project's website, which was launched in 2008, won Green Project of the Year Award at the 2008 Inspired IT Awards. and a 2009 eGovernment Award for marketing.

References

External links
 Culgreen.ie website (archived 2013)

Croke Park